CMFB, in the context of European statistics, stands for Committee on Monetary, Financial and Balance of Payments Statistics. Originally established in 1991, the Committee is an advisory committee for the European Commission (Eurostat) and European Central Bank and a platform for cooperation between the statistical and central banking community in Europe (CMFB).

Main tasks 
The Commission, on its own initiative, and, should the occasion arise, following a request from the Council or from the committees which assist them, shall consult the Committee on:
 the establishment of multiannual Community programmes for monetary, financial and balance of payments statistics;
 the measures which the Commission intends to undertake to achieve the objectives referred to in the multiannual programmes for monetary, financial and balance of payments statistics and the resources and timetables involved;
 any other question, in particular questions of methodology, arising from the establishment or implementation of the Statistical Programme in the relevant fields.
The Committee may express opinions on its own initiative on any questions relating to the establishment or the implementation of statistical programmes in the monetary, financial and balance of payments fields.

CMFB opinions 
The CMFB's main output is its opinion, adopted by a majority of its members, according to the applicable rules of procedure (special rules apply for adoption opinion in the context of the Excessive Deficit Procedure).

Below is a list of the most recent and relevant opinions that the Committee has concluded, upon the request of one or more EU Member States:

The CMFB's advisory role in the EU's Excessive Deficit Procedure (EDP) 
 The format of the questionnaires shall be defined by the Commission (Eurostat) after consultation of the Committee on Monetary, Financial and Balance of Payments Statistics (hereinafter referred to as CMFB).
 The inventories shall be prepared in accordance with guidelines adopted by the Commission (Eurostat) after consultation of CMFB.
 In the event of a doubt regarding the correct implementation of the ESA 95 [today: ESA 2010] accounting rules, the Member State concerned shall request clarification from the Commission (Eurostat). The Commission (Eurostat) shall promptly examine the issue and communicate its clarification to the Member State concerned and, when appropriate, to the CMFB.
 For cases which are either complex or of general interest in the view of the Commission or the Member State concerned, the Commission (Eurostat) shall take a decision after consultation of the CMFB. The Commission (Eurostat) shall make decisions public, together with the opinion of the CMFB, without prejudice to the provisions relating to statistical confidentiality of Regulation (EC) No 322/97.

The CMFB's role in ensuring the quality of statistics underlying the EU's Macroeconomic Imbalance Procedure (MIP) 
The (ECOFIN) Council of the European Union, in its 2015 conclusions on EU statistics, recalled that the Macroeconomic Imbalances Procedure must rely upon sound and harmonised official statistics. The Council welcomed the close cooperation of the ESS and the ESCB, using existing fora, in ensuring the reliability of the statistics underlying the Macroeconomic Imbalances Procedure (MIP) and their comparability, welcomed the production of the first ESS-ESCB quality report on MIP statistics and encouraged the two statistical systems to give high priority to taking forward this programme.

As the statistics underlying MIP indicators are compiled, depending on domain, either or both by both the European Statistical System (ESS) and the European System of Central Banks (ESCB) within their respective spheres of competence, the two systems continuously cooperate statistical quality assurance  mechanisms to ensure that these statistics are reliable and comparable across Member States. According to the Memorandum of Understanding between the ESS and the ESCB, the Committee on monetary, financial and balance of payments statistics (CMFB) is the operational platform for such cooperation.

The CMFB, starting 2013, developed a three level quality assurance framework for the statistics underlying the Macroeconomic Imbalance Procedure and published the related quality reports (Quality reports concerning statistics underlying the MIP indicators).

References 

Statistical organizations
Non-institutional bodies of the European Union